The year 2023 began with several state efforts to legalize adult-use or medical cannabis, despite an apparently stalled federal effort to do so. A cannabis industry executive predicted that at least two states would enact adult-use  reform in 2023, with the most likely states to legalize being Minnesota, Pennsylvania and Ohio. Cannabis eradication for outdoor grows continue in states where the plant is both illegal and legal. Raids in Indiana are conducted by helicopter by State Police Departments and National Guard units.

2023 Oklahoma State Question 820 was rejected by over 60% of voters, the largest margin of defeat for a legalization measure since the beginning of the Green rush.

Federal

Legislation
HR 610, the "Marijuana 1-to-3 Act" to reschedule cannabis to Schedule III of the Controlled Substances Act was introduced by Greg Steube (R) on January 27. It was referred the Committee on Energy and Commerce.

Executive action
On February 28, the Office of Personnel Management published a notice in the Federal Register that it was requesting Office of Management and Budget approval to overhaul of Federal pre-employment forms to reduce the period of scrutiny regarding cannabis use to the past 90 days, a change already posted as proposed rules in the Federal Register in 2022. The new form is to be called "Personnel Vetting Questionnaire" and will replace several screening forms including the SF-85 and SF-86.

State legislation and initiatives
Kind Idaho was gathering signatures for a medical cannabis legalization initiative at the end of 2022.

Oklahoma State Question 820 concerning adult-use legalization  on the ballot for the March 7, 2023 special election, after missing the 2022 deadline.

West Virginia House Bill 2091, legalization, was introduced on January 11, the first day of the legislative session.

Washington S.B. 5123 "Concerning the employment of individuals who lawfully consume cannabis" was heard in Senate Labor & Commerce Committee, mid January. The state senate passed the bill on February 22.

Kentucky governor Andy Beshear asked the state legislature to create a legislatively authorized medical program, after some degree of opening the door to one in 2022 via his own executive order. House Bill 48 to legalize cannabis was introduced by Nima Kulkarni on January 3. Senate Bill 47 to create a medical cannabis program cleared a committee on March 14, prior to Senate readings. It was the first time a legalization bill had received a state senate hearing. The bill was approved 26-11 by the senate on March 16.

Minnesota HF 100 legalizing adult use was filed in January and immediately endorsed by governor Tim Walz. The bill was advanced by the House Commerce Committee on January 11 following a hearing on it.

In Hawaii, a "dual use" task force was authorized by the state legislature in 2021 to study and recommend options for legalization "to the legislature no later than twenty days prior to the convening of the regular session of 2023". In the second half of 2022, Hawaii lawmaker Ryan Yamane and other members of the task force met with industry leaders and activists to plan legalization efforts to occur during the 2023 legislative session. The task force sent its report to the legislature in December 2022. In January 2023, Jeanné Kapela announced her intention to introduce a legalization bill in the 2023 session. Senate Bill 375, creating a legal adult-use market under the Hawaiʻi Cannabis Authority, was approved by its first committee on February 16. Senate Bill 669, legalization of possession for adult use, was introduced in February.

South Carolina H 3561 to decriminalize cannabis was introduced on January 10. Competing medical cannabis bills, the South Carolina Compassionate Care Act and the Put Patients First Act, both with bipartisan sponsorship, were also pre-filed in January for consideration during the 2023 session. H. 3486, Compassionate Care Act was filed on January 10.

Iowa Senate File 73, legalization, was introduced in January. A house bill was introduced on February 21.

Free All Cannabis for Tennesseans Act, Tennessee SB 0168 and HB0085, legalization, was introduced in January.

Delaware HB1, a legalization bill, and HB2, to regulate and tax sales, were introduced on January 20. HB1 was approved by the House on March 7, and HB2 was approved on March 9.

The New Hampshire legislature held hearings on a legalization and regulated sales bill in January. House Bill 360 passed in the House by voice vote on March 16. HB360 legalizes cannabis in the state, without new taxes or regulations.

The Virginia Senate passed SB1133, a legalized sales bill, on February 7.

In Louisiana, a suite of bills to enact legalization and regulation was prefiled in February: HB-17, HB-24, and HB-12.

Kansas House Bill 2363, amnesty or effective decriminalization, was introduced in February. Kansas House Bill 2367, adult-use legalization and regulation, was also introduced in February.

Texas SB 209 and HB 1831, adult-use legalization and regulation, were introduced or read for the first time in 2023. SJR 22 and companion bills HJR 91 and HJR 89 were introduced, and if enacted would refer to the voters a constitutional amendment legalizing cannabis. House Bill 1937 would allow cities and counties to opt-in to legalization. House Bill 218, decriminalization and expungement of past offenses, was approved by a final committee on March 7 prior to a house floor vote.

References

Further reading

External links
Marijuana on the ballot at Ballotpedia

Cannabis reform proposals 2023
Cannabis reform 2023

2023 United States
Reform proposals 2023